Alexandra Baron is a German female mixed martial arts (MMA) fighter. She won Jewels' tournament Rough Stone Grand Prix 2009 at the -60 kg category.

Background
Her birth name is Alexandra Sanchez, and her earlier fights were all under that name. Later she fought as Buch-Sanchez or just Buch.

Martial arts training
Buch started training in martial arts in 1999, training in Muay Thai. She moved to Berlin in search for a new gym (MMA Berlin) and it was there that she started training in grappling and MMA.

Mixed martial arts career

In the Rough Stone GP 2009 –60 kg final, Baron submitted Japanese fighter Tomoko Morii with an armbar in the first round, winning the tournament.

 Alexandra Baron returned to MMA at MMAB - MMA Bundesliga in Herne, North Rhine-Westphalia, Germany to compete against Dutch Jorina Baars. She lost the fight in Round one by Submission (Guillotine Choke).

At Respect.FC 9 in Dormagen, Germany on April 13 Alexandra Buch faced Dutch Megan van Houtum. She won the fight by TKO (Doctor stoppage) due to a cut at the nose of van Houtum.

 at No Compromises 2 in Hamburg, Germany Buch fought within a 4-women tournament. In the semi-final she defeated Jessy Schwarz by Unanimous decision. She won the final fight vs Anne Merkt via heelhook.

Alexandra Baron lost her next fight on November 7, 2013 against Danish Maria Hougaard-Djursaa at European MMA 7 in Aarhus, Denmark. At Superior Challenge 12 in Malmö, Sweden on May 16, 2015 she was defeated by Swede Lina Akhtar Länsberg by TKO due to ground and pound. The fight was for the Bantamweight title of the promotion.

Mixed martial arts record

|-
| Loss
| align=center| 8-6-0
| Lucie Pudilová
| Submission (guillotine choke)
| Clash FC: Clash of the Titans
| 
| align=center| 1
| align=center| N/A
| Plzeň,  Czech Republic
| 
|-
| Loss
| align=center| 8-5-0
| Katharina Lehner
| Decision (unanimous)
| German MMA Championship 7
| 
| align=center| 3
| align=center| 5:00
| Castrop-Rauxel,  Germany
| 
|-
| Loss
| align=center| 8-4-0
| Lina Länsberg
| TKO (punches and elbows)
| Superior Challenge 12
| 
| align=center| 1
| align=center| 2:30
| Malmö,  Sweden
| 
|-
| Loss
| align=center| 8-3-0
| Maria Hougaard
| Submission (rear-naked choke)
| European MMA 7
| 
| align=center| 1
| align=center| 4:59
| Aarhus,  Denmark
| 
|-
| Win
| align=center| 8-2-0
| Anne Merkt
| Submission (inverted heel hook)
| No Compromises 2
| 
| align=center| 1
| align=center| 4:54
| Hamburg, Germany
| 
|-
| Win
| align=center| 7-2-0
| Jessy Schwarz
| Decision (unanimous)
| No Compromises 2
| 
| align=center| 2
| align=center| 5:00
| Hamburg, Germany
| 
|-
| Win
| align=center| 6-2-0
| Megan van Houtum
| TKO (doctor stoppage)
| Respect Fighting Championship 9
| 
| align=center| 2
| align=center| N/A
| Dormagen, North Rhine-Westphalia, Germany
| 
|-
| Loss
| align=center| 5-2-0
| Jorina Baars
| Submission (guillotine choke)
| MMAB - MMA Bundesliga 1
| 
| align=center| 1
| align=center| N/A
| Herne, North Rhine-Westphalia, Germany
| 
|-
| Win
| align=center| 5-1-0
| Melissa Lan
| Decision (unanimous)
| Respect Fighting Championships 4
| 
| align=center| 3
| align=center| 5:00
| Herne, North Rhine-Westphalia, Germany
| 
|-
| Win
| align=center| 4-1-0
| Tomoko Morii
| Submission (armbar)
| Jewels 6th Ring
| 
| align=center| 1
| align=center| 3:39
| Kabukicho, Tokyo, Japan
| 
|-
| Win
| align=center| 3-1-0
| Katharina Schlosser
| TKO (punches)
| MMA Berlin Turnier #17
| 
| align=center| 2
| align=center| 4:55
| Berlin, Germany
| 
|-
| Loss
| align=center| 2-1-0
| Sheila Gaff
| Submission (heel hook)
| MMA Berlin Turnier #16
| 
| align=center| 1
| align=center| 1:59
| Berlin, Germany
| 
|-
| Win
| align=center| 2-0-0
| Shizuka Sugiyama
| Decision (unanimous)
| Jewels 5th Ring
| 
| align=center| 2
| align=center| 5:00
| Kabukicho, Tokyo, Japan
| 
|-
| Win
| align=center| 1-0-0
| Tanja Hoffmann
| Submission (rear-naked choke)
| MMA Berlin Turnier #15
| 
| align=center| 3
| align=center| 2:13
| Berlin, Germany
|

Championships and accomplishments
Rough Stone GP 2009 –60 kg tournament winner

See also
List of female mixed martial artists

References

External links
 Alexandra Buch at Awakening Fighters

Profile at Alligator Rodeo Team 

German female mixed martial artists
Mixed martial artists utilizing Muay Thai
German people of Spanish descent
1979 births
Living people
German Muay Thai practitioners
Female Muay Thai practitioners
Sportspeople from Wuppertal
Sportspeople from Hamburg